Bob de Groot is a Belgian comics artist and writer, born on 26 October 1941 in Brussels, to Dutch and French parents.

Career
While still a young art student de Groot got his first comics experience as an assistant to Maurice Tillieux on Félix. He began creating shorter work for the Franco-Belgian comics magazine Pilote, with creators such as Hubuc, Reiser. With Fred as scenarist he drew the strip 4 × 8 = 32 L'Agent Caméléon in the late 60s. When the artist Turk joined to assist on the series, de Groot gradually took on increasing amounts of work as scenarist and went on to collaborate with Turk on several series, including Archimède, Robin Dubois and eventually Raymond Macherot's Clifton. They also created Léonard for Achille Talon magazine in 1975, before de Groot began a prolific production of comics scenarios for many comics artists, including Tibet, Dupa, Philippe Francq, Greg and Dany. With Rodrigue he created Doggyguard and continued the Clifton series, and with Morris he collaborated on stories for Lucky Luke and Rantanplan.

Bibliography

Sources

 Bob de Groot publications in Spirou, Pilote, Vaillant and Pif, Belgian Tintin and French Tintin, BDoubliées 
 Béra, Michel; Denni, Michel; and Mellot, Philippe (2002): "Trésors de la Bande Dessinée 2003–2004". Paris, Les éditions de l'amateur. 
 Matla, Hans: "Stripkatalogus 9: De negende dimensie". Panda, Den Haag, 1998. 

Footnotes

External links 

 Bob de Groot biography on Lambiek Comiclopedia

1941 births
Living people
Artists from Brussels
Belgian comics artists
Belgian comics writers
Belgian humorists
Belgian people of Dutch descent
Belgian people of French descent